Russell “Russ” Murphy was a U.S. soccer player who spent time with St. Louis Kutis S.C.  He also earned two caps with the U.S. national team in 1957.

Club career
Murphy played with St. Louis Kutis S.C. during the mid-1950s when they were a dominant U.S. team.  Kutis won the 1957 National Amateur Cup and National Challenge Cup.  Murphy was inducted into the St. Louis Soccer Hall of Fame in 1984.

National team
After Kutis won the 1957 National Cup, the US Football Association decided to call up the entire team to represent the U.S. in two World Cup qualification games.  As a result, Murphy earned two caps with the U.S. national team, both losses to Canada. The first was a 5–1 loss on June 22, 1957.  The second game was a July 6 loss to Canada.

References

United States men's international soccer players
Soccer players from St. Louis
St. Louis Kutis players
Living people
American soccer players
Association footballers not categorized by position
Year of birth missing (living people)